Kara Lynn Massey (born February 16, 1985), known professionally as  Kara Lindsay, is an American stage actress and singer, best known for her roles as Katherine Plumber in Newsies (2012) and Glinda in Wicked (2014, 2016, 2018, 2019).

Education
Kara Lynn Lindsay was born in Rochester, New York, and attended Greece Athena High School, studying under acclaimed director and teacher Judith Ranaletta, before studying at Carnegie Mellon University, where she received a BFA in acting/musical theatre.

Career
In 2009, Lindsay appeared as Laura in a musical theatre production at the Paper Mill Playhouse of Little House on the Prairie with Melissa Gilbert, who played Laura in the original television series, as "Ma". Lindsay originated the role of Katherine Plumber in Newsies, a Disney musical written for the stage by Harvey Fierstein, in 2011. The character is the fictional love interest of protagonist Jack Kelly, but Lindsay said she drew inspiration for her portrayal from the real-life investigative journalist, Nellie Bly. She continued her role when Newsies moved to Broadway and played her final performance on February 2, 2014.

From April 2 to November 23, 2014, Lindsay played the role of Glinda in the second national tour of Wicked, where she starred opposite Laurel Harris as Elphaba. She then reprised the role of Glinda on Broadway on December 16, 2014, until January 31, 2016, when she was replaced by Carrie St. Louis, who had previously replaced her on tour as Glinda. On November 1, 2016, Lindsay returned to the role of Glinda on Broadway, replacing Carrie St. Louis. She returned to the 2nd national tour of Wicked in 2018, and exited the company, alongside Jackie Burns, on February 24, 2019, in Salt Lake City.

Personal life
In 2008, Lindsay and Kevin Massey met at the final callbacks for Little House on the Prairie. They began dating around 2009, when the show went on tour, and became engaged after the tour had ended. Lindsay married Massey on June 2, 2013. Together they have a son, Emerson Charles Massey, who was born on November 12, 2019. Lindsay and Massey appear annually at the Disney Epcot International Festival of Arts in Orlando, Florida.

Filmography

Television

Theater

References

External links
karalindsay.com, Kara Lindsay's official website
Profile, broadway.com; accessed January 10, 2016.

American stage actresses
Living people
Carnegie Mellon University College of Fine Arts alumni
1985 births
Greece Athena High School alumni
People from Rochester, New York